Euphorbia glabriflora is a species of plant in the family Euphorbiaceae. It is native to Albania, Greece, and the former Yugoslavia.

References 

glabriflora
Flora of Albania
Flora of Greece
Flora of Yugoslavia